Clifton Cricket Club is an English cricket club based on Manchester Road (A666) in Clifton, Salford.

The club were founder members of the Greater Manchester Cricket League (GMCL) in 2016 and play in that league's Premier division, finishing 3rd in the inaugural. season.

Clifton's current Captain is former Lancashire and Derbyshire all rounder and wicketkeeper Gareth Cross.

References

External links

Central Lancashire League cricket clubs
Sport in the City of Salford
Organisations based in Salford